Robert Carson Allen (born 10 January 1947 in Salem, Massachusetts) is Professor of Economic History at New York University Abu Dhabi. His research interests are economic history, technological change and public policy and he has written extensively on English agricultural history. He has also studied international competition in the steel industry, the extinction of Bowhead Whales in the Eastern Arctic, and contemporary policies on education.

He obtained his B.A. at Carleton College, Minnesota in 1969 and his Ph.D. at Harvard University in 1975. He has been a professor since 1973, first at Hamilton College then from 1975 in the Department of Economics of the University of British Columbia. Since 2000 he has been associated with the University of Oxford, and from 2002 has been Professor of Economic History  and a fellow of Nuffield College.

Bob Allen retired from Oxford University in 2013. He is now Global Distinguished Professor of Economic History at New York University, Abu Dhabi.

He has been awarded the Ranki Prize of the Economic History Association for his 1992 and 2003 works (see below).

Books 
 1992: Enclosure and the Yeoman: The Agricultural Development of the South Midlands, 1450-1850
 2003: Farm to Factory: A Re-interpretation of the Soviet Industrial Revolution
 2007: Engels' Pause: A Pessimist`s Guide to the British Industrial Revolution, Economics Series Working Papers 315, University of Oxford, Department of Economics. 
 2009: The British Industrial Revolution in Global Perspective
 2011: Global economic history: a very short introduction
 2017: The Industrial Revolution: a very short introduction

See also 
 Engels' pause
 List of historians
 List of economic historians

References

External links 
 Robert C. Allen at nuff.ox.ac.uk
 Robert Carson Allen Research Papers in Economics

British historians
Economic historians
Living people
1947 births
Fellows of Nuffield College, Oxford
Carleton College alumni
Harvard University alumni
Hamilton College (New York) faculty
American emigrants to England
Academic staff of the Vancouver School of Economics
Presidents of the Economic History Association